Matt Valenti (born April 12, 1984, Newton, New Jersey) is a two-time NCAA Division I national champion wrestler from the University of Pennsylvania.  He won the 133 pound weight class at the NCAA tournament in both 2006 and 2007 and finished in 5th place in 2004 at 125 pounds.  He is currently the Associate Athletic Director for Student Development at the University of Pennsylvania.

Career
Valenti currently holds Penn's career win record with 137 collegiate victories.  He was a three-time EIWA champion, a four-time NCAA qualifier, and three-time first team All-Ivy selection.  He was celebrated twice as EIWA Wrestler of the Year and was the Ivy League Wrestler of the Year in 2007. He was an Olympic hopeful, qualifying for the 2012 USA Olympic trials, losing in the semifinals to Olympic bronze medalist Coleman Scott.  Valenti has also been inducted into the Kittatinny Regional High School, Sussex County Sports, NJSIAA Region I, EIWA and Penn Athletics Hall of Fame.

Valenti was recruited and brought to Penn by current head coach Roger Reina, but was coached to both national titles by former coach, Zeke Jones. He wrestled at Penn with his younger brother Andy, while 
the youngest sibling Derek was an All-American for the University of Virginia.

Valenti, a Stillwater Township, New Jersey native, attended Kittatinny Regional High School where he was a two-time New Jersey state champion.  He also earned a Junior National title in freestyle his senior year. He is married to Kimberly Parsons Valenti who is the head gymnastics coach at Ursinus College.

References

Living people
American wrestlers
People from Newton, New Jersey
People from Stillwater Township, New Jersey
University of Pennsylvania alumni
1984 births